Toney Grissom or Tony Grissom was a Baptist minister, farmer, and state legislator in Arkansas. His employer owed him money after he left and then had him "silenced" from preaching after Grissom sued him for the it. A Republican, he represented Phillips County, Arkansas for two terms in the Arkansas House of Representatives from 1873 until 1875.

The House was in session from January 6 to April 25 during his first term in 1873. He also served as assessor in Phillips County in 1875. He was relatively prosperous and 32 years old in 1870.

References

Members of the Arkansas House of Representatives
Year of birth missing (living people)